The California Association of Marriage and Family Therapists (CAMFT) is a non-profit 501(c) professional organization with approximately 30,000 members dedicated to preserving the ethical standards of Marriage and Family Therapists in California.  The association was founded in 1964 by Dr. Dominick Amorelli, Dr. Elsie V. King, Dr. George L. McGhee, Allan M. Myerson, and Dr. Paul A. Verdier.

Overview 
The California Association of Marriage and Family Therapists is dedicated to the advancement of marriage and family therapy as an art, a science and a mental health profession, and the advancement of the common business interests of its member(s). It has authored and lobbied numerous laws to legitimize the Marriage and Family Therapist profession.  Many state legislatures have used the laws that California passed regarding marriage and family therapy as models for their own laws.

Marriage and Family Therapists are relationship specialists who treat persons involved in interpersonal relationships. They are trained to assess, diagnose and treat individuals, couples, families and groups to achieve more adequate, satisfying and productive marriage, family and social adjustment. The practice also includes premarital counseling, child counseling, divorce or separation counseling and other relationship counseling. Marriage and Family Therapists are psychotherapists and healing arts practitioners licensed by the State of California. Requirements for licensure include a related master's or doctoral degree, completion of at least 3,000 hours of supervised experience, followed by both a comprehensive exam and a written clinical vignette exam.
 
The terms "Marriage and Family Therapist" and "Marriage, Family and Child Counselor" are used interchangeably, as the latter was formerly the title of the license in California.  However, all states who regulate the profession, now including California use the title, "Marriage and Family Therapist."

The California Association of Marriage and Family Therapists provides www.CounselingCalifornia.com as an online resource to the public looking for Marriage and Family Therapists located in California. The comprehensive online directory has over more than 7,500 licensed mental health professionals listed with their skills, area of expertise, educational background and other information that can ensure a positive and successful therapy experience.

Commonly known as “relationship experts,” Marriage and Family Therapists go beyond marriage and family counseling and are trained to assess, diagnose and treat individuals with depression, anxiety, addiction and other serious mental illnesses.

External links
California Association of Marriage and Family Therapists
CounselingCalifornia.com is a therapist locator service in California which provides the consumer references to mental health providers, as well as helpful articles and tips on mental health issues.  
Social Construction Therapies Network

Family therapy
Mental health organizations in California
Relationship counseling